American singer and songwriter Martha Wash has released three studio albums, one compilation album, and 34 singles. She has a total of 12 number-one hits on Billboard's Dance chart to date. Her success has earned her the honorific title The Queen of Clubland.

In 1989, Wash recorded several songs for Italian house music group Black Box. They released a single called "I Don't Know Anybody Else", which featured Wash's recorded vocals. The song became Wash's first number-one hit on Dance chart as a featured artist. Their success was followed by the release of their next single "Everybody Everybody" (1990), and later "Strike It Up" (1991). Wash, who was not a core member of the group, did not receive proper sleeve credits on the songs until she won a lawsuit against the distributing record label for royalties and directly contributed to legislation ensuring proper credit for vocalists on both songs and music videos. In the same year, she featured on another single called "Gonna Make You Sweat (Everybody Dance Now)" by C+C Music Factory. The song achieved success peaking at number-one on many international charts and became certified platinum.

In January 1993, Wash released her debut self-titled album. The album spawned the number one Dance hits "Carry On" and "Give It to You". In 1997, American DJ and producer Todd Terry released an album, Ready for a New Day. The album featured the number-one Dance singles "Keep on Jumpin'" and "Something Goin' On", which also featured Wash and Jocelyn Brown. In 1998, Wash released her greatest hits album The Collection. The lead single "It's Raining Men...The Sequel", which featured RuPaul, peaked at number twenty-two on the Club Play chart. She released "Catch the Light", which became her tenth number-one song on Billboard'''s Dance Chart. The final single "Come" was also release which chart in the top-five.

In January 2013, Wash release her second album Something Good. The album spawn the singles: "I've Got You", "It's My Time", and the top-charted single "I'm Not Coming Down". In January 2020, Wash released her third album Love & Conflict''.

Albums

Studio albums

Compilation albums

Singles

As main performer

As featured performer

Soundtrack appearances

See also
 The Weather Girls discography

Notes

References

Discographies of American artists
Electronic music discographies
Pop music discographies
Rhythm and blues discographies
Soul music discographies